Rue George Post is a street in Beirut, Lebanon.  The street, which is located in the Ras Beirut district, was named after Dr. George Edward Post, one of the founders of the American University of Beirut.  Dr. Post was professor of surgery (1869 until his death in 1909), who also contributed to the study of ecology and vegetation of the Middle East.  The residential street is located north of the American University of Beirut campus between Rue Van Dyck and Dar El Mreissé, one block south of the seaside Corniche Beirut.

In Literature
Soujourns by Christina Pantoja-Hidalgo
"'And are there ladder-streets, too?' I asked. He grinned broadly. 'Come to think of it, there's one right behind our flat.' As we swung into the Avenue de Paris, I decided that this time, I would keep a journal. . . Tony has found us a furnished flat in a little street called Rue George Post— a charming place. . . ."

See also
Ras Beirut
Beirut

External links
 The George Edward Post Project

References

Post, Rue George